Artem Lutchenko (born on 4 January 1992) is a Ukrainian professional footballer who last played as a goalkeeper for Chernihiv.

Career
In 2015 he moved to YSB Chernihiv.

FC Chernihiv 
In 2017 he moved to FC Chernihiv, recently promoted to the Ukrainian Second League. On 10 April 2021 he saved a penalty by Oleh Bereza in a match against Karpaty Lviv at the Chernihiv Arena.

Career statistics

Club

Honours
FC Chernihiv
 Chernihiv Oblast Football Championship:  2019

Sevastopol
Ukrainian First League: 2009–10

References

External links
Official website of FC Chernihiv
Profile on Official website of Ukrainian Second League

1992 births
Living people
Footballers from Chernihiv
Ukrainian footballers
Association football goalkeepers
SDYuShOR Desna players
FC Chernihiv players
FC Sevastopol players
FC Sevastopol-2 players